Philadelphia Fusion is an American esports team founded in 2017 that competes in the Overwatch League (OWL). The Fusion began playing competitive Overwatch in the 2018 season.

All rostered players during the OWL season (including the playoffs) are included, even if they did not make an appearance.

All-time roster

References

External links 
 Philadelphia Fusion roster

 
Philadelphia Fusion
Philadelphia